Kerux: The Journal of Northwest Theological Seminary is an academic journal of theology. The name comes from the Greek word for "herald" or "preacher" (κῆρυξ). It focuses on biblical theology in the tradition of Geerhardus Vos.

References

External links 
 

Christianity studies journals
Publications established in 1986
English-language journals
Triannual journals